Changhonggongyuan station, is a station of Line 2 and Line 6 western section of the Tianjin Metro. It started operations on 1 July 2012.

Description
Changhonggongyuan Station is a three-story underground station. Located on the basement level, the station hall has a subway customer service center, which can provide passengers manual ticket purchase, recharge of subway stored-value cards, and lost and found services.  In addition, self-service facilities such as ticket vending machines, ticket inspection machines, and ATMs are also available in the station hall.  The line 2 platform is located on the second basement. It is an island platform. The line 6 platform is located on the third floor of the basement. It is an island platform too.

References

External links 

Railway stations in Tianjin
Railway stations in China opened in 2012
Tianjin Metro stations